Azaxia dyari is a moth of the family Notodontidae. It is found in Costa Rica.

References

Moths described in 1911
Notodontidae
Moths of Central America